The Social Work and Research Centre ("SWRC"), widely known  as the Barefoot College  is a voluntary organisation working in the fields of education, skill development, health, drinking water, women empowerment and electrification through solar power for the upliftment of rural people, which was founded by Bunker Roy in 1972. It is registered under Friends of Tilonia Inc.

The "Villagers' Barefoot College" in the village of Tilonia gives lessons in reading, writing and accounting to adults and children especially the "drop-outs, cop-outs and wash-outs." Girls heavily outnumber boys in the night schools. In 2008 there were approximately 3,000 children attending 150 night schools.

In the profile acknowledging Roy as one of Time 100 most influential people for his work with the Barefoot College, Greg Mortenson wrote that the grass-roots social entrepreneurship has trained more than 3 million people for jobs in the modern world, "in buildings so rudimentary they have dirt floors and no chairs" so that poor students feel comfortable.

History
Bunker Roy is the founder of what is now called Barefoot College. After conducting a survey of water supplies in 100 drought prone areas, Roy established the Social Work and Research Centre in 1972. Its mission soon changed from a focus on water and irrigation to empowerment and sustainability. The programs focused on siting water pumps near villages and training the local population to maintain them without dependence on outside mechanics, providing training as paramedics for local medical treatment, and on solar power to decrease dependence and time spent on kerosene lighting. Roy has been named one of the 50 environmentalists who could save the planet by the Guardian and one of the 100 most influential people in the world by TIME magazine.

Night Schools were begun that allowed students who worked to support their families during the day to still receive training. The organisation has utilised a system of training the trainers to bring skills training to villages.

In 1997, Kamala Devi became first female solar engineer trained by the college's programs. She continued to work with the college. In 2012, she became the head of the solar unit at Kadampura.

Methodology

The programs are influenced by the Gandhian philosophy of each village being self-reliant. The policy of the Barefoot College is to take students, primarily women from the poorest of villages and teach them skills such as installing, building and repairing solar lamps and waterpumps without requiring them to read or write. In extreme cases, there are students without verbal fluency in the languages of their teachers.

The participating villages create a Village Energy and Environment Committee which determines the rates the villagers will pay for the solar panels and identifies which of the poorest residents of the town will go to the college for training. The students receive 6-month training program learning about solar panels and storage batteries before returning home where they maintain and repair the systems.

The college does not give out any degrees or certificates. V. Krishna has described the approach as "de-mystifying high technology" to rural villages to show that with the right training, "the uneducated and semi-literate can operate and manage" items like solar panels and water pumps.

Rajasthan's traditional art of puppetry has been utilised by the college to "spread information on health, education and human rights".

Campus
The buildings used for the school have dirt floors and no chairs so that "poor students feel comfortable".

The campus sits on 8 acres, has rainwater harvesting design and was built by the students.

Cross-cultural collaboration
In 2012, the Barefoot College became the first NGO partner with UNESCO's Global Partnership for Girls' and Women's Education. A UNDP funded program of India's Ministry of External Affairs brings women from villages in rural Africa (which do not have electricity) to the school for training, after which they return with new skills to install solar electricity in their villages. The college entered into an agreement in 2012 to expand the programs for students from Fiji.

The documentary film Solar Mamas, funded by the Skoll Foundation and the Sundance Institute, follows a Jordanian woman as she joins with other women from around the world to participate in the solar engineering training at Barefoot College.

An exhibition of photographs taken by the students of the Barefoot College was presented at the School of Oriental and African Studies in London.

From Problem to Solution
Barefoot College, like all groundbreaking, influential places, started out as simply an idea. Acting upon that idea was what got Barefoot College going. Sanjit “Bunker” Roy wanted to come up with alternative ways to address India’s very prevalent poverty and inequality issues. This is just what he did. When people care about a certain issue, two types of changes can result. The person could decide to spend as much of their time as they possibly can by volunteering towards a particular cause that changes this certain issue, or, like Roy, they make it their life mission to change the issue themselves and make a livelihood out of helping the problem become a solution.

By creating Barefoot College, Bunker Roy has made service-learning his livelihood – he has become an entrepreneur by making his job to be helping the community. Because of his dedication and determination, Barefoot College endeavors to help the poverty and inequality issues by teaching the people in the community the basic skills they need to survive and be effective in their community – without having to hire people to do the simple jobs. The college also provides women with training to learn how to do things normally dominated by men. It gives the women equality with the men and helps them to become more self-sufficient. The “professionals” that started out at the college were geologists, economists, doctors, social workers, charted accountants, graduates, and post graduates who wanted to support and help the same cause that Roy did. By teaching the people how to better themselves and giving them an opportunity to become literate and further their knowledge in practical areas, Barefoot College didn’t just fix the problem of poverty and inequality; it brought the citizens into the solution so that the Indian community would feel that they were doing their part to help their community. They are now more efficient, effective, resourceful, knowledgeable citizens who are fighting to have a productive and profitable society thanks to the brainchild of Sanjit Roy that is Barefoot College.

Awards and achievements
In 1998, it was awarded the Indira Gandhi Paryavaran Puraskar (Indira Gandhi Environment Award), by the Ministry of Environment and Forests, Government of India. 
In 2003, the Barefoot College won an Ashden Award for its work bringing solar power to rural villages.
In 2013 it was declared that Bunker Roy would receive a 'Clinton Global Citizen Award', along with young activist Malala Yousufzai.

Returned award
The creators of the campus near Tilonia received the Aga Khan Award for Architecture. Originally the award was attributed to "an illiterate farmer", but later the award was corrected and redesignated to read "A young architect, Neehar Raina, prepared the architectural layout and an illiterate farmer from Tilonia, along with 12 other Barefoot Architects, constructed the buildings." when the presenters became aware of the involvement of professional architect Neehar Raina. Because of the inclusion of Raina, Roy did not accept the award on behalf of the school and returned it.

Notable participants 
 Nauroti Devi, former Sarpanch of Harmada Gram Panchayat in Rajasthan.

External links
The Barefoot Approach, essay from Sumithra Prasanna for the International Museum of Women

See also

 Paulo Freire
 
 The Solar Night Schools Programme, The Barefoot College ∗ India

References

Universities and colleges in Rajasthan
Educational institutions established in 1972
Organizations established in 1972
Organisations based in Rajasthan
Ajmer district